The supraorbital nerve is one of two branches of the frontal nerve, itself a branch of the ophthalmic nerve. The other branch of the frontal nerve is the supratrochlear nerve.

Structure 
The supraorbital nerve branches from the frontal nerve midway between the base and apex of the orbit. It travels anteriorly above the levator palpebrae superioris and exits the orbit through the supraorbital foramen (or notch) in the superior margin orbit. It exits the orbit lateral to the supratrochlear nerve. It then ascends onto the forehead beneath the corrugator supercilii and frontalis muscles and divides into a medial branch and lateral branch.

Function 
The supraorbital nerve provides sensory innervation to the skin of the lateral forehead and upper eyelid, as well as the conjunctiva of the upper eyelid and mucosa of the frontal sinus.

Additional images

References

Ophthalmic nerve